The family of head of state and government in Pakistan is an unofficial title for the family of the head of state or head of government of a country (usually a republic). In Pakistan, the term First Family usually refers to the head of state (the President) or head of government (the Prime Minister), and their immediate family which comprises their spouse (the First Lady or First Gentleman) and their descendants. In the wider context, the First Family may comprise the head of state or head of government's parents, siblings and extended relatives.

Jinnah family 

Jinnah family is the family of the founder of Pakistan. Its most notable member, Muhammad Ali Jinnah, is the founder of Pakistan. He is revered in Pakistan as Quaid-i-Azam (Great Leader) and Baba-i-Qaum ("Father of the Nation"); his birthday is a national holiday there. Jinnah was Pakistan's first Governor-General from independence until his death on 11 September 1948. His younger sister, Fatima Jinnah, was one of the leaders of modern-state of Pakistan. She is commonly known in Pakistan as Khātūn-e Pākistān ("Lady of Pakistan") and Māder-e Millat ("Mother of the Nation").

Notable members of the family are:

First Generation
 Poonja Gokuldas Meghji, the grandfather of Muhammad Ali Jinnah and Fatima Jinnah.

Second Generation
 Mitthibai Jinnahbai (1857–1902) was married to Jinnahbai Poonja.

Third Generation
 Muhammad Ali Jinnah, the founder of Pakistan and was the country's first Governor-General.
 Ahmed Ali Jinnah
 Bunde Ali Jinnah
 Rahmat Ali Jinnah
 Fatima Jinnah (1893–1967), known as Mother of the Nation.
 Shireen Jinnah
 Maryam Jinnah

Fourth Generation
 Dina Wadia (b. 1919), born to Muhammad Ali Jinnah and Maryam Jinnah. Last member of the Jinnah family.

Ayub family 

The members of Ayub's family:

 Ayub Khan (President of Pakistan, 1958–1969)
 Begum Ayub Khan (First Lady of Pakistan, 1958-1969)

The children of the couple:

First Generation
 Gohar Ayub Khan (Federal Minister for Minister of Foreign Affairs: 25 February 1997 – 7 August 1998)

Second Generation
 Omar Ayub Khan (Federal Minister for Economic Affairs: 17 April 2021 – 10 April 2022)

Bhutto family 

A Pakistani political family which has been dominant in the Pakistan Peoples Party (PPP) for most of Pakistan's history since independence. 
Zulfikar Ali Bhutto was the founder of PPP and served as the ninth Prime Minister of Pakistan from 1973 to 1977, and prior to that as the fourth President of Pakistan from 1971 to 1973. His daughter, Benazir Bhutto, also served as the 11th Prime Minister of Pakistan in two non-consecutive terms from 1988 until 1990 and 1993 until 1996. She was married to Asif Ali Zardari, the who became President of Pakistan after her death. Her daughters alternately served as the First Lady of Pakistan.

Notable members of Bhutto family are:

First Generation
 Ghulam Murtaza Bhutto, grandfather of Zulfiqar Ali Bhutto.

Second Generation
Shah Nawaz Bhutto –– The Dewan of Junagadh and the Father of Zulfiqar Ali Bhutto (Member Bombay Council).
 Wahid Baksh Bhutto –- (1898 –- 1931) was a landowner of Sindh, an elected representative to the Central Legislative Assembly and an educational philanthropist.

Third Generation
 Zulfikar Ali Bhutto, son of Shah Nawaz (President (1970–1973); Prime Minister (1973–1977))
 Nusrat Bhutto, wife of Zulfikar (former minister without portfolio)
 Mumtaz Bhutto, cousin of Zulfikar, (chief of Bhutto tribe, former chief minister and Governor of Sindh, Federal Minister of Pakistan)

Fourth Generation
 Benazir Bhutto, daughter of Zulfikar (Prime Minister, 1988–1990 and 1993–1996), assassinated December 27, 2007.
 Murtaza Bhutto, elder son of former Prime Minister of Pakistan Zulfikar Ali Bhutto and the brother of former Prime Minister of Pakistan Benazir Bhutto. He was usually known as Murtaza Bhutto and was assassinated under mysterious circumstances.
 Shahnawaz Bhutto, Shahnawaz was studying in Switzerland when Zia ul Haq's military regime executed his father in 1979. Prior to the execution On July 18, 1985, the 27-year-old Shahnawaz was found dead in Nice, France. He died under mysterious circumstances.
 Ameer Bux Bhutto, currently Vice President of Sindh National Front and also ex-Member of Sindh Assembly. He is son of Mumtaz Bhutto.

Fifth Generation
 Fatima Bhutto, Fatima was born in Kabul, Afghanistan while her father Murtaza Bhutto was in exile during the military regime of General Zia ul Haq. Murtaza Bhutto, was son of former Pakistan's President and Prime Minister, Zulfiqar Ali Bhutto.
 Bilawal Bhutto Zardari, son of former Prime Minister Benazir Bhutto and former President Asif Ali Zardari. Chairman of Pakistan People's Party and the current Foreign Minister of Pakistan.

Chaudhry family

Chaudhry's are a prominent name to the politics of Pakistan since Pre-Partition hailing from Gujrat, Punjab. They can be traced back to the sixteenth century.
 First Generation
 Chaudhry Zahoor Elahi (assassinated on September 25, 1981) was a Pakistani politician who rose to prominence from a small town of Gujrat, Punjab, Pakistan.

 Second Generation
 Chaudhry Shujaat Hussain is a senior conservative politician hailing from Gujrat and a business oligarch who previously served as 17th Prime minister of Pakistan from 30 June 2004
 Chaudhry Pervaiz Elahi is a Pakistani politician who served as the first and only Deputy Prime Minister of Pakistan in 2013.
 Chaudhry Wajahat Hussain is a Pakistani politician who had been a member of the National Assembly of Pakistan from 2002 to 2013 And Former Federal Minister For Human Development 
 Moonis Elahi is a Pakistani politician who had been a Member of the Provincial Assembly of the Punjab from 2008 to May 2018
 Chaudhry Hussain Elahi, an MNA from Gujrat.
 Chaudhary Arif Ali, local ruler from Kasur.

Sharif family 

Sharif family is a prominent political family of Pakistan which is actively involved in politics of Pakistan though Pakistan Muslim League (N) (PMN-N). PML-N is currently headed by Nawaz Sharif. Nawaz Sharif served as the 12th Prime Minister of Pakistan in three non-consecutive terms from November 1990 to July 1993, from February 1997 until October 12, 1999 and from May 2013 until July 2017. He also remained Chief minister of the Punjab. His brother, Shahbaz Sharif, is the current Chief Minister of the Punjab. They previously remained the First Family for two times in non-consecutive terms and currently hold the title as well. Since, Nawaz has been ousted by the Supreme Court of Pakistan, he will no longer be allowed to take part in politics for 10 years. His family including his daughter Maryam Safdar, and sons Hassan and Hussain Nawaz, have received a negative blow to their political careers.

Notable family members:
First Generation
 Muhammad Sharif, father of Nawaz Sharif.

Second Generation
 Nawaz Sharif, Former Prime Minister of Pakistan
Kalsoom Nawaz Sharif is the wife of Nawaz Sharif and was the First Lady of Pakistan in two non-consecutive terms from 1990 till 1993 and from 1996 till 1998.
 Shahbaz Sharif, former chief minister of the Punjab and current Prime Minister of Pakistan.
Begum Nusrat Shahbaz, first wife of Shahbaz Sharif.
Aaliya Honey, second wife of Shahbaz Sharif.
Tehmina Durrani, third wife of Shahbaz Sharif.
 Muhammad Abbas Sahrif, A Pakistani businessman and brother of Nawaz Sharif and Shabaz Sharif.
 Sabiha Abbas, wife of Abbas Sharif.

Third Generation
 Hussain Nawaz Sharif, son of Nawaz Sharif.
 Hassan Nawaz Sharif, son of Nawaz Sharif.
 Maryam Nawaz Sharif, daughter of Nawaz Sharif.
 Hamza Shahbaz Sharif, Son of Shahbaz Sharif and the  Member of Ex-National Assembly of Pakistan.
Salman Shahbaz Sharif, son of Shahbaz Sharif.
Rabia Imran, daughter of  Shahbaz Sharif.

Soomro family
Members of Soomro family in politics are:
 Khan Bahadur Allah Bux Soomro, Twice Chief Minister of Sindh
 Elahi Bux Soomro, remained Member of National Assembly of Pakistan, Speaker National Assembly of Pakistan, Federal Minister
 Rahim Bux Soomro, Minister Sindh
 Mohammad Mian Soomro, remained President of Pakistan, Prime Minister of Pakistan, Senate of Pakistan and Governor of Sindh

Qazi family 
Members of Qazi family, of Punjab:
 Qazi Noor Muhammad , leader of QAZI clan, Punjab son of Karam Elahi

Zia-ul-Haq family 

The members of Zia-ul-Haq's family:

 Muhammad Zia-ul-Haq (President of Pakistan, 1978–1988)
 Begum Shafiq Zia (First Lady of Pakistan, 1978-1988)

The children of the couple:

 Muhammad Ijaz-ul-Haq (Federal Minister for Religious Affairs & Minorities: January 2004 – November 2007)
 Zain Zia 
 Dr. Anwar ul Haq (Member of National and Provincial Assembly, provincial minister in Nawaz Sharif's first government)
 Dr. Quratulain Zia
 Rubina Saleem

Noon family 

Noon family is major political family of Pakistan. The family belongs to Sargodha (Shahpur District in Mughal and British Era). The Noon family is a Rajput family with its roots in this region, owning around 20 contiguous villages in the Bhalwal/Bhera, Shahpur (noon jageer) regions.

Members of Noon family:

 Malik Adnan Hayat Noon of Nurpur Noon (Sargodha)
Ex-MNA, Ex-Chairman Nur Pur Foods, Chairman Noon Sugar Mills.
 Malik Amjad Ali Noon of Alipur Noon (Sargodha)
Ex-Ambassador, Ex-Parliamentarian, Ex-District Governor, Ex-Chairman (Prime Minister Inspection Commission, Prime Minister Grievance Cell, Punjab Squash). Ex- Vice President Pakistan Squash. He is the son of Malik Anwar Ali Noon.
 Maj (R) Malik Anwar Ali Noon Patriarch of Alipur Noon (Sargodha)
Ex- Parliamentarian. Founding member of PPP and Senior Leader in Sargodha. Celebrated Armoured Corp. Officer of the British Indian Army (Pre Partition).
 Malik Feroz Khan Noon Of Nurpur Noon (Sargodha)
Ex-Prime minister of Pakistan. Ex- High Commissioner of India (Pre-Partition) to United Kingdom.
Ex- Chief Minister Joint Bengal (Pre-Partition). Sir Malik Feroz Khan Noon was instrumental in negotiating Gwadar’s handover to Pakistan during his tenure as Foreign Minister of Pakistan. 

His wife, Lady Viqar UK Nisa, was an active social reformer and founded the Noon Foundation, which offers scholarships to deserving Pakistanis in Oxford University (UK) and Cambridge University (UK). A school founded by her in Bangladesh is remains one of top girls school in the country.

Leghari family 

The members of Leghari family, in politics:

Farooq Leghari (ex President of Pakistan)
Awais Leghari (MPA, MNA, Federal Minister)
Rafique Haider Khan Leghari (MPA "Punjab"), Minister, Chairman District Council RY Khan
Sardar arshad khan leghari
(MNA), Federal Minister)
Sardar Azhar Khan Leghari
(MPA) Chairman District Council RY khan
Sardar Asif Khan Leghari
Landlord Rahimabad

Zardari family 

The members of Zardari family, in politics:

 Hakim Ali Zardari, the patriarch of Zardari family. He served as the District Mayor (Zila Nazim) of Nawabshah in the year 1964 and was later elected as Member of the National Assembly in the year 1970, 1988 and 1993.
 Asif Ali Zardari, son of Hakim Ali Zardari  and husband of Benazir Bhutto, ex-President of Pakistan who also served as MNA from 1988–1990, 1993–1996 and as a Senator from 1996–1999.
 Azra Peechoho, daughter of Hakim Ali Zardari Member of National Assembly from 2002–2008, 2008–2013 and 2013-date
 Faryal Talpur, daughter of Hakim Ali Zardari, Former Nazima (District Mayor) Nawabshah District from 2001–2005 and 2005–2008 later MNA from 2008–2013 and 2013-date
 Bilawal Bhutto Zardari, son of Asif Ali Zardari and Benazir Bhutto, Chairman Pakistan Peoples Party, assumed political successor of the Zardari and Bhutto family

Abbasi family
 Khaqan Abbasi, former Minister for Industries and Production.
 Shahid Khaqan Abbasi, Ex-Prime Minister of Pakistan, former Minister of Petroleum and Natural Resources
 Sadia Abbasi, former senator

Imran Khan family

Members of Imran Khan's family, who are noted mainly for contributions in sports and politics:

 First Generation
 Wajid Ali Khan Burki, maternal uncle
 Jahangir Khan, maternal uncle
 Ahmed Raza, maternal uncle

 Second Generation
 Imran Khan, the former Prime Minister and former cricket captain
 Bushra Bibi, wife of Imran Khan
 Javed Burki, maternal cousin
 Jamshed Burki, maternal cousin
 Nausherwan Burki, maternal cousin
 Asad Jahangir, maternal cousin
 Majid Khan, maternal cousin
 Inamullah Niazi, paternal cousin

 Third Generation
 Bazid Khan, son of Majid Khan and maternal first-cousin once removed

Hayat Khan Family
First Generation
Abu'l-Khattar al-Husam ibn Darar al-Kalbi

See also 
 List of Pakistani political families
 Politics of Pakistan

References

Further reading